Scott Bowden (born 4 April 1995) is an Australian mountain biking and road cyclist, who currently rides for French amateur team Bourg-en-Bresse Ain Cyclisme. He rode in the road race and the cross-country at the 2016 Summer Olympics, representing Australia. Bowden first started cycling while he was a student at St. Virgil's College, Tasmania.

Major results
2015
 1st  Cross-country, Oceania Under-23 Mountain Bike Championships
2016
 1st  Cross-country, National Under-23 Mountain Bike Championships
2017
 6th Road race, National Under-23 Road Championships
2019
 6th Road race, National Road Championships
 9th Overall Tour of China II
2021
 3rd Road race, National Road Championships

References

External links

1995 births
Living people
Australian male cyclists
Cyclists at the 2016 Summer Olympics
Olympic cyclists of Australia
Sportspeople from Hobart